Everything Falls Apart is the debut studio album by Hüsker Dü released in January 1983 by Reflex Records.

Critical reception

In a 1983 Trouser Press review, Jon Young said, "Yeah! Hyperspeed agression!...Buzzsaw guitars! Shouting! A disrespectful version of "Sunshine Superman"!...Not Bad!"

Reissue
The album was released on compact disc in 1993 as Everything Falls Apart and More, with bonus tracks including the band's first two singles, the full version of "Statues" lasting over eight minutes, and an unreleased track recorded in a St. Paul, Minnesota, basement called "Do You Remember?" (the English translation of "husker du" from both Danish and Norwegian). The reissue also includes extensive liner notes by Terry Katzman, co-founder of Reflex Records and soundman for the band from 1980 to 1983, as well as lyrics to a few of the songs. On June 18, 2017, a remastered version of the original album was released digitally by the Chicago reissues label The Numero Group and also included in the Savage Young Dü box set.

Track listing

Notes
Adapted from the liner notes of Everything Falls Apart and More.

"In a Free Land", "What Do I Want?" and "M.I.C." – single, May 1982; recorded at Blackberry Way, Minneapolis, February 1982; remixed at Creation Studio, Minneapolis, June 1992
"Statues" – previously unreleased extended version; edit issued as a single, January 1981; recorded at Blackberry Way, Minneapolis, August 1980; remixed at Absolute Music, Minneapolis, August 1992  
"Let's Go Die" – previously unreleased outtake from the "Statues" session; recorded at Blackberry Way, Minneapolis, August 1980
"Amusement" – B-side of "Statues", January 1981; recorded live at Duffy's, Minneapolis, October 1980 
"Do You Remember?" – previously unreleased demo; recorded live in a St. Paul basement, 1980

Personnel
Adapted from the liner notes of Everything Falls Apart and More.
Hüsker Dü
Bob Mould – guitar, vocals
Greg Norton – bass, vocals
Grant Hart – drums, vocals
Hümper Dü Boys Choir
Robin Henley – backing vocals
Steve "Mugger" Corbin – backing vocals
Merrill Ward – backing vocals
Technical
Spot − producer, engineer
Hüsker Dü − producer
Fake Name Graphx − sleeve
Everything Falls Apart and More
Hüsker Dü – producer (13–19), compilation producer 
Colin Mansfield – producer (16, 17), engineer (18) 
Steve Fjelstad – engineer (13–18)
Terry Katzman – recorded by (18), liner notes
Bill Bruce – recorded by (19)
Brian Paulson – remix, remix engineer (13–15)
Grant Hart – remix (16)
Matt Zimmerman – remix engineer (16) 
Bill Inglot – remastering 
Dan Hersch – remastering 
Doug Myren − compilation producer 
Rachel Gutek – design

References

Hüsker Dü albums
1983 albums
Albums produced by Spot (producer)
Albums produced by Bob Mould
Reflex Records albums